Salmi (Finnish and , lit. inlet) is a rural locality (a settlement) in Pitkyarantsky District of the Republic of Karelia, Russia. Municipally, it is incorporated within and serves as the administrative center of Salminskoye Rural Settlement of Pitkyarantsky Municipal District. Population: 3,800 (2007 est.). Postal code: 186821.

It was established in 1500.

Sister cities
Salmi is twinned with:
 Pielavesi (Finland)

References

Rural localities in the Republic of Karelia
Pitkyarantsky District
Former municipalities of Finland
Populated places established in 1500
1500 establishments in Europe
16th-century establishments in Finland

fi:Salmi (taajama)

Former urban-type settlements of Karelia